David Bruce Murray (4 December 1882 – 10 December 1915) was a Scottish professional footballer who played as a full-back in the Football League for Leeds City, Liverpool and Everton. He also played non-league football for Mexborough Town and Frickley Colliery. He played for Liverpool as the club won successive Second Division and First Division titles in 1904–05 and 1905–06. He went on to serve in the Army during World War I and was killed in the Battle of Loos.

Career
Murray began his career in Scotland, before joining Everton for the 1903–04 season, making two First Division appearances. He then switched clubs to Liverpool, and made 12 appearances for the "Reds" in the 1904–05 season to help the club to win promotion as champions of the Second Division. He played just three games in the 1905–06 season as Liverpool won the First Division title. He joined Leeds City for a £130 fee in December 1905, with the Liverpool Daily Post predicting that he "should be a capital acquisition to Leeds". He scored two goals in 25 games in the second half of the 1905–06 season, and was named as captain for the 1906–07 campaign. He scored three goals in 36 appearances during the 1907–08 season, but lost his first team place in the 1908–09 season. He went on to play amateur football for Mexborough Town in the Midland League and Frickley Colliery in the Sheffield Association League.

Personal life
Murray worked as a miner in Mexborough. In early September 1914, three weeks after the outbreak of the First World War, he enlisted as a private in the Argyll and Sutherland Highlanders. He took part in the battles of Hill 70 and Loos and was killed during the latter on 10 December 1915. Murray is commemorated on the Loos Memorial.

Career statistics

Honours
Liverpool
Football League Second Division: 1904–05
Football League First Division: 1905–06

References

1882 births
1915 deaths
Footballers from Glasgow
Scottish footballers
Association football fullbacks
Rangers F.C. players
Everton F.C. players
Liverpool F.C. players
Leeds City F.C. players
Mexborough Athletic F.C. players
Port Vale F.C. players
Frickley Athletic F.C. players
English Football League players
Midland Football League players
British Army personnel of World War I
Argyll and Sutherland Highlanders soldiers
British military personnel killed in World War I